Sulfur oxide refers to many types of sulfur and oxygen containing compounds such as SO, SO2, SO3, S7O2, S6O2, S2O2, etc.

Sulfur oxide (SOx) refers to one or more of the following: 

 Lower sulfur oxides (SnO, S7O2 and S6O2)
 Sulfur monoxide (SO) and its dimer, Disulfur dioxide (S2O2)
 Sulfur dioxide (SO2)
 Sulfur trioxide (SO3)
 Higher sulfur oxides (SO3 and SO4 and polymeric condensates of them)
 Disulfur monoxide (S2O)